The 2021–22 Lipscomb Bisons men's basketball team represented Lipscomb University in the 2021–22 NCAA Division I men's basketball season. The Bisons, led by 3rd-year head coach Lennie Acuff, played their home games at the Allen Arena in Nashville, Tennessee as members of the West Division of the ASUN Conference.

Previous season
The Bisons finished the 2020–21 season 15–12, 9–6 in ASUN play to finish in third place. In the quarterfinals of the ASUN tournament, the Bisons lost to Florida Gulf Coast.

Roster

Schedule and results

|-
!colspan=12 style=| Non-conference regular season

|-
!colspan=9 style=| ASUN Conference regular season

|-
!colspan=12 style=| ASUN tournament

|-

Sources

References

Lipscomb Bisons men's basketball seasons
Lipscomb Bisons
Lipscomb Bisons men's basketball
Lipscomb Bisons men's basketball